Dardenne Prairie is a city in St. Charles County, Missouri, United States. The population was 11,494 at the 2010 census.

Geography
Dardenne Prairie is located southwest of O'Fallon on Missouri Route N, just east of I-64.

History
Dardenne Prairie was originally a prairie region which began in the area near St. Peters and extended north of Dardenne Creek, almost to Peruque Creek. The area was named after the stream.
In early documents the name appeared as Dardonne Creek, Darden Creek, Dardenne River, or Dardonne River. In Houck's history of 1908, Dardene River is also found.

Dardenne is said to be a corruption of the French "Terre d'Inde", meaning the land of turkeys. Terre d'Inde actually translates to "Land of India". "Turkey Land" on the other hand in French is Terre des Dindons so the above explanation is not plausible. A better explanation is that the name was borrowed from the Dardenne family, early pioneers in the Mississippi Valley. "A Touissant Dardenne from Montreal, Canada, married Marie Francoise Lever, 'veuve de feu Michal Vieu,' at St. Anne de Fort Chartres, November 21, 1747. One of these Dardennes may have first camped and hunted on this creek and thus given it his name." Touissant Dardenne, at Fort de Chartres on this matrimonial occasion, was still several hundred miles nearer to the creek he was supposed to have named than any other person named Dardenne because no one by the name of Dardenne has ever owned land in St. Charles County, either under Spanish dominion or since the transfer. There is, of course, no reason why this creek, heavily wooded throughout its course, could not, by some French trapper, have been named Dardenne (or d'Ardenne in French) in memory of the Ardennes on the river Meuse in French Flanders.

In the meticulous journal that William Clark kept on his trip west to establish Fort Osage in 1808 (only two years after returning from the Lewis and Clark Expedition), we find the first description of the prairie land around the Dardenne Creek area:

August 25th "Set out from St. Charles, at half past 11 oClock a.m., and proceeded on, passed Several branches of the Dardan Creek a branch of the Mississippi, through a Butifull high rolling Country interspersed with plains of high grass Most of them rich & fertile, and encamped at a pond at the out Skirts of the Settlement in a butifull Plain, near a few low trees. had a Camp guard of 1st. 2d & 16 privates. Many of the Citizens visit us this evening. 21 miles".

Demographics

2010 census
As of the census of 2010, there were 11,494 people, 3,670 households, and 3,208 families living in the city. The racial makeup of the city was 90.7% White, 3.5% African American, 0.1% Native American, 3.5% Asian, 0.5% from other races, and 1.6% from two or more races. Hispanic or Latino of any race were 2.0% of the population.

There were 3,670 households, of which 51.7% had children under the age of 18 living with them, 79.0% were married couples living together, 5.7% had a female householder with no husband present, 2.7% had a male householder with no wife present, and 12.6% were non-families. 10.8% of all households were made up of individuals, and 4.5% had someone living alone who was 65 years of age or older. The average household size was 3.13 and the average family size was 3.38.

The median age in the city was 38 years. 33.3% of residents were under the age of 18; 5% were between the ages of 18 and 24; 25.8% were from 25 to 44; 26.2% were from 45 to 64; and 9.6% were 65 years of age or older. The gender makeup of the city was 49.0% male and 51.0% female.

2000 census
As of the census of 2000, there were 4,384 people, 1,431 households, and 1,273 families living in the city. The racial makeup of the town was 96.42% White, 1.67% African American, 0.11% Native American, 0.96% Asian, 0.07% Pacific Islander, 0.36% from other races, and 0.41% from two or more races. Hispanic or Latino of any race were 0.96% of the population.

There were 1,431 households, out of which 48.8% had children under the age of 18 living with them, 84.3% were married couples living together, 3.3% had a female householder with no husband present, and 11.0% were non-families. 8.5% of all households were made up of individuals, and 2.1% had someone living alone who was 65 years of age or older. The average household size was 3.05 and the average family size was 3.25.

In the city the population was spread out, with 32.3% under the age of 18, 3.9% from 18 to 24, 37.1% from 25 to 44, 19.7% from 45 to 64, and 7.0% who were 65 years of age or older. The median age was 34 years. For every 100 females there were 99.5 males. For every 100 females age 18 and over, there were 97.3 males.

The median income for a household in the city was $77,086, and the median income for a family was $80,486. Males had a median income of $56,780 versus $30,037 for females. The per capita income for the city was $29,325. None of the families and 0.7% of the population were living below the poverty line, including no one under the age of 18 and 3.0% of those over 64.

Education
Dardenne Prairie spans the Fort Zumwalt, Wentzville and Francis Howell School Districts.

References

External links

 City of Dardenne Prairie
 Lake St. Louis Dardenne Prairie Area Chamber of Commerce

Cities in St. Charles County, Missouri
Populated places established in 1983
Cities in Missouri